Thorium(IV) hydroxide is an inorganic compound with a chemical formula Th(OH)4.

Production
Thorium(IV) hydroxide can be produced by reacting sodium hydroxide and soluble thorium salts.

Reactions
New thorium(IV) hydroxide is soluble in acid but its solubility will decrease when older.

Thorium(IV) hydroxide will break up at high temperature and produce thorium dioxide:
Th(OH)4 → ThO2 + 2 H2O

At high pressure, thorium(IV) hydroxide reacts with carbon dioxide, and produce thorium carbonate hemihydrate.

References

Hydroxides
Thorium compounds